The Baker–Duderstadt Farm is a historic farmstead located at 30 DuBois Road in Warren Township of Somerset County, New Jersey. The  farm, along with five contributing buildings, was added to the National Register of Historic Places on November 26, 2008, for its significance in architecture and ethnic heritage.

History
In the 1840s, John Baker, a German immigrant, purchased farmland here. According to family history, his son, George, built the Half-Timbered Barn between 1847 and 1849. In 1865, George sold the farm to his sister, Sophia, who was married to Charles Zimmer. They deeded the farm to their daughter, Kate, one part in 1884 and another in 1886. Kate was married to Hugo Duderstadt. Their son, George S. Duderstadt, born in 1879, later owned the farm and was active in the community. The Duderstadt family sold the farm to the county in 1998.

Contributing properties
The Baker–Duderstadt Farmhouse, built in the early 20th century, is a two and one-half story building. The Half-Timbered Barn was built mid 19th century. It was constructed with a German, half-timbered style. The building is now protected with exterior plywood. It has a Jerkinhead roof. The nearby Large Barn is also contributing.

References

External links
 
 

National Register of Historic Places in Somerset County, New Jersey
New Jersey Register of Historic Places
Farms on the National Register of Historic Places in New Jersey
Houses on the National Register of Historic Places in New Jersey
Warren Township, New Jersey